Mselliet is an area in northern Malta, lying within the limits of Mġarr and St. Paul's Bay. It is primarily made up of agricultural land, and it has Mselliet Valley.
Places

References 

 Agricultural regions
Geography of Malta
Mġarr
St. Paul's Bay